Byremo is a village in Lyngdal municipality in Agder county, Norway. Byremo was also the administrative centre of the old municipality of Grindheim until its dissolution in 1964.

Byremo is the site of a medical clinic and a local elementary and high school.  There is some timber/lumber industries located in the village, as well as a bank, grocery store, and gas station.  The small Grindheim farm lies on the north side of Byremo, and it is the site of Grindheim Church.

References

Villages in Agder
Lyngdal